Vortex was a steel roller coaster located at Kings Island amusement park in Mason, Ohio. Designed and manufactured by Arrow Dynamics at a cost of $4 million, the ride officially opened to the public on April 11, 1987. It was also the first coaster to feature six inversions.

Vortex occupied the same location in the park once held by The Bat, the world's first suspended roller coaster. Tied to the coaster's debut, attendance at Kings Island exceeded 3 million in 1987 for the first time. It accommodated more than 46 million guests throughout its lifespan, making Vortex one of the most frequently-ridden attractions in park history. It closed permanently on October 27, 2019.

History
On May 30, 1986, Kings Island announced that they would be adding a new roller coaster for the 1987 season. For the design and construction of the attraction, Kings Island turned to Arrow Dynamics, an industry-leading manufacturer at the time. It would sit in the former location of The Bat, the world's first suspended roller coaster, which was removed after the 1984 season. The defunct coaster's line queue and train station were retained and reused for the new ride. 

Construction began in early June 1986 when The Bat's area was cleared. The following month, Kings Island announced that they would be naming the new coaster Vortex. The park invested over $4 million in the ride, which required 750 tons of steel to construct. It opened to the public on April 11, 1987, and helped the park exceed 3 million visitors for the first time in its history. At its inauguration, Vortex briefly set two world records among full-circuit roller coasters. Both were surpassed the following year with the debut of Shockwave at Six Flags Great America.

On September 27, 2019, the park announced plans to close Vortex permanently on October 27, 2019. Area Manager Don Helbig stated that the coaster had reached the end of its service life. During its lifespan, Vortex accommodated over 46 million riders, ranking it seventh in Kings Island's history .

While Vortex was demolished, the trains were taken to Carowinds so that Carolina Cyclone could use them as replacement parts.

On September 29, 2020, Kings Island announced that they would be selling pieces of Vortex for $198.70. The pieces would be sold in 1.5-inch slices, capped with metal plates and mounted in a display stand.

Ride experience

Inversions

Layout

As the train left the station, it dipped slightly, taking a hard right into the beginning of the lift hill. The train then ascended into a left-hand turn that was slightly banked, as the track leveled out. After turning roughly 180 degrees, the track straightened briefly before descending into a sharp left turn that took riders through two vertical loops. Following the vertical loops, the train ascended and made a 180-degree turn to the right into a mid-course brake run, slowing the train nearly to a complete stop. The train then dropped into a pair of corkscrews, the second of which threaded through the gap directly between the previously-encountered vertical loops. The train then went through a right hand turn and a boomerang, that inverted riders two additional times. There was an on-ride camera in the dip of the boomerang at its midpoint. The train then entered its final maneuver – a 450-degree ascending clockwise helix – that generated positive g forces before the train hit the final brake run. The train made a final right-hand turn before returning the station.

Incidents
On July 2, 2011, a computer detected damage to Vortex's chain lift as a train was pulling out of the station. The ride was stopped and all passengers were able to safely exit. The ride remained closed for several weeks while a replacement part was on order.

References

External links

Official Vortex page

Roller coasters in Ohio
Roller coasters operated by Cedar Fair
1987 establishments in Ohio